Smoke Glacken (foaled 1994 in Maryland, died April 21, 2016) was an American Champion Thoroughbred racehorse. Sired by Two Punch, a son of the important sire Mr. Prospector, his dam was Majesty's Crown, a daughter of Irish stakes winner Magesterial, who was a son of Northern Dancer.

Trained by Henry Carroll, at age two, Smoke Glacken finished second in his racing debut, then won four straight, including the Tyro Stakes and the Grade II Sapling Stakes, both at Monmouth Park Racetrack. His most important win of 1996 was the Grade I Hopeful Stakes at Saratoga Race Course, which he won by nine lengths. He finished his two-year-old season with $284,500 in earnings.

A sprint horse best at distances of a mile or less, in his three-year-old season Smoke Glacken won six of his eight races and finished second and third in his other two starts. He won the Grade II Frank J. De Francis Memorial Dash Stakes at Laurel Park, the Grade III Riva Ridge Stakes at Belmont Park, the Grade III Southwest Stakes at Oaklawn Park by eight lengths, the Grade III Jersey Shore Breeders' Cup Stakes, the Mountain Valley Stakes, and the Black Gold Stakes. He was second in the Grade II Lexington Stakes at Keeneland to Touch Gold and third in the Grade III Louisiana Derby to Crypto Star and Half Watch by a half-length. He finished his three-year-old season with $475,060 in earnings.

In addition, his 1997 performances earned him that year's Eclipse Award for American Champion Sprint Horse.

Offspring
Smoke Glacken entered stud in 1998 at Gainesway Farm in Lexington, Kentucky. For the 2010 breeding season, his stud fee was $12,500.

Smoke Glacken's descendants include:

c = colt, f = filly

References

External links
  Smoke Glacken's pedigree and partial racing stats
 Smoke Glacken at Gainesway Farm

1994 racehorse births
2016 racehorse deaths
Racehorses bred in Maryland
Racehorses trained in the United States
Eclipse Award winners
Thoroughbred family 1-n